Night Dive Studios, Inc. (doing business as Nightdive Studios) is an American video game developer based in Vancouver, Washington. The company is known for obtaining rights to abandonware video games, updating them for compatibility with modern platforms, and re-releasing them via digital distribution services.

It was founded in November 2012 by Stephen and Alix Kick, former video game artists for Sony Online Entertainment, after Stephen Kick found himself unable to purchase the 1999 game System Shock 2. He successfully negotiated with the rightsholder Star Insurance Company, which had acquired System Shock and other assets from the defunct developer Looking Glass Studios, and Nightdive Studios released the game via GOG.com in February 2013.

History

Founding and System Shock 2 (2012–2013) 
Nightdive Studios was founded by Stephen Kick and his wife, Alix Kick, both former character artists at Sony Online Entertainment (SOE). Kick was with that company for three years, working on Free Realms and PlanetSide 2. While Banegas had left the company earlier to establish a plushie business, Kick remained in his position until 2012. After also quitting his job, he and Banegas, then his fiancée, commenced a nine-month-long road trip from San Diego through Mexico and Central America. To pass the time during this trip, Kick brought a netbook and several classic video games to play. While staying in a hostel in Guatemala, he wished to play the 1999 game System Shock 2 but found that the CD-ROM version he had brought no longer worked on his netbook. Kick looked for fan-made patches for the game and tried purchasing an updated version via GOG.com to no avail, and he discovered that there no longer was a legal way to obtain the game. The rights to the System Shock franchise had been acquired from its defunct developer, Looking Glass Studios, by Star Insurance Company (a subsidiary of Meadowbrook Insurance Group), while the trademark was retained by the game's publisher, Electronic Arts.

Starting in October 2012, Kick sent various emails to Star Insurance Company to inquire about the status of the series' intellectual property (IP). To his surprise, the company's legal counsel responded within a few days, asking Kick what he was planning to do with the IP. Star Insurance Company had recently acquired the System Shock trademark from Electronic Arts but was wary of producing a new entry in the series given the high cost associated with such a production. Kick pitched the idea of updating System Shock 2 for modern platforms and re-releasing it via digital distribution services, including GOG.com and Steam. He argued that the game was highly sought after, as over 34,000 people had placed it onto their GOG.com wishlists, and that a re-release would be profitable. The insurer was fond of this idea, so Kick and Banegas, who had then almost reached the Panama Canal, returned to the United States. Arriving in New Mexico, Kick began phoning with Star Insurance Company's legal counsel and eventually reached a deal. He raised money from his friends and family to pay the license fee for System Shock 2 and establish a company. Subsequently, Kick and Banegas founded Night Dive Studios on November 7, 2012. Kick assumed the role of chief executive officer, while Banegas became the chief financial officer. The company name was inspired by their shared passion for diving, especially night diving, and Kick specifically recalled one night dive he had experienced in the Great Barrier Reef. Night Dive Studios was initially located in Portland, Oregon, later moving to nearby Vancouver, Washington.

Around the time of the company's foundation, a French developer known as Le Corbeau released a patch for System Shock 2 that allowed it to run on modern computers. Kick was unsuccessful in contacting the developer but still used the patch as the new version's groundwork, asserting that it was the IP holder's legal right to use it. Night Dive Studios worked with Kick's former SOE colleagues and GOG.com on updates and further bugs fixes. The updated version was released onto GOG.com in February 2013. According to Banegas, the game's returns in its first month painted Night Dive Studios as a viable business. Kick decided to continue Night Dive Studios in similar efforts to bring back older games to modern systems. The company's first hire was Daniel Grayshon, a writer of System Shock modding guides based in the United Kingdom. Night Dive Studios brought System Shock 2 to Steam in May 2013. Later that year, it released updated versions of I Have No Mouth, and I Must Scream, Harlan Ellison's 1995 game based on his eponymous short story; Wizardry VI, VII, and 8; and the Trilobyte games The 7th Guest and The 11th Hour.

Subsequent history (2013–present) 
In 2014, Night Dive Studios re-released 28 edutainment games from Humongous Entertainment, as well as the adventure game Bad Mojo. The company also generated speculation that it might be planning to re-release The Operative: No One Lives Forever, as news sources took notice of a Night Dive Studios trademark filing that included material referencing the No One Lives Forever franchise. Kick responded to these rumors by saying that the company could not comment on future releases for the time being. Kick later revealed that they had indeed been working on trying to acquire the publishing rights for both No One Lives Forever and its sequel, to the point where they had the original source code to construct a remake of the title, but could not get the three companies with stake in the games' IP, Activision, 20th Century Fox, and Warner Bros., to negotiate the rights.

2014 also saw the company's participation in the Humble Bundle series of games collections, with a Humble Bundle package in May 2014 that featured all of the company's titles through that date, and a "flash sale" bundle in July that featured the company's Humongous Entertainment re-release titles. In December 2014, Night Dive Studios coordinated the re-release of the 1996 first-person shooter role playing hybrid game Strife as Strife: Veteran Edition, after acquiring rights to the game. Because the game's source code had been lost, a derivative of the Chocolate Doom subproject Chocolate Strife was used as the game's engine, with its original programmers being contracted to do additional coding for the re-release. The source code of Strife: Veteran Edition has been made available under GPLv3 on GitHub by Night Dive Studios' and Samuel "Kaiser" Villarreal on December 12, 2014. While this was the first source code opened for a Night Dive Studios release, Kick announced his commitment in recovering, preserving and also opening of more source code in a Reddit AMA in 2016.

In February 2015, Kick announced that the studio was working on re-releasing PowerSlave for digital distribution services with an added bonus of porting the Saturn version into the package. Kick also announced that he was working with the original developers of Noctropolis and the original source code and the updated package will feature remastered music, widescreen support and bug fixes. Using the funds generated by past releases, Night Dive Studios acquired the System Shock IP from Star Insurance Company in August 2015, intending to create a remake of the first System Shock. The company released an enhanced version of the original game, which adds support for more resolutions and mouselook, in September that year. Night Dive Studios has since announced it has acquired full rights to the System Shock series, and are considering developing a third title in the series, as well as remakes for both previous titles, working with original concept artist Robert Waters for some of the design. By December 2015, the company had licensed the System Shock IP to OtherSide Entertainment, headed by former Looking Glass Studios creative director Paul Neurath, for the development of System Shock 3. In May 2016, Night Dive Studios rebranded as Nightdive Studios.

Operations 
Nightdive Studios is headquartered out of the Kicks' house in eastern Vancouver, Washington. As of February 2022, the company employs 40 people, including Larry Kuperman as the director of business development. Most staff work remotely, with locations including San Francisco and New Zealand. According to Kick, this distribution allows the studio to operate "on pretty much a 24/7 basis", while employees collaborate via GitHub, Jira, and Slack. However, he noted that this setup also caused a lack of in-office socializing and camaraderie.

Technology 
While researching for the development of an updated version of Turok: Dinosaur Hunter, Nightdive Studios became aware of a reverse engineering project of the game's Nintendo 64 version by Sam "Kaiser" Villareal. The company hired him and developed his custom game engine into the KEX Engine, using which the developers can add modern features to older games. Aside from Turok: Dinosaur Hunter, the engine has been used for the company's Turok 2: Seeds of Evil, Forsaken Remastered, System Shock: Enhanced Edition (via a 2018 update), Blood: Fresh Supply, Doom 64, Quake, Shadow Man Remastered, PowerSlave Exhumed, Blade Runner: Enhanced Edition, and the upcoming SiN Reloaded, System Shock 2: Enhanced Edition, and Rise of the Triad: Ludicrous Edition. Villareal remains Nightdive Studios' lead engine developer as of February 2022.

Games

Original releases

Remasters and enhanced ports

References

External links 
 

2012 establishments in Washington (state)
Companies based in Vancouver, Washington
American companies established in 2012
Video game companies established in 2012
Video game companies of the United States
Video game development companies
Video game publishers